Thetis Island (population: 379) is an island and unincorporated community off the coast of British Columbia, Canada, lying between Vancouver Island, which is to the west across Stuart Channel, and the west   from the north tip of Galiano Island, from which it is separated by Trincomali Channel. With its immediate southern neighbour Penelakut Island (formerly Kuper Island), it is one of the Gulf Islands. Two north to south land ridges define the east and west sides of the island. Burchell Hill is 503 feet above sea level, and forms the high point on the west side of Thetis island, and Moore Hill is 511 feet above sea level, and forms the high point ridge on the east side of the island

Name origin
The island was named in 1851 after HMS Thetis, a 36-gun Royal Navy frigate commanded by Captain Augustus Leopold Kuper (after whom Kuper Island was formerly named).  The ship was named after the Nereid Thetis from Greek mythology.

History
Before contact, two Cowichan tribes inhabited Thetis Island, the Yekolaos and the Lilmalche.

Thetis was first settled by Europeans in 1874 but permanent settlement took hold in the 1890s and 1900s.  One of the early families on Thetis Island was the Hunter family. In 1891 Peter & Joseph Hunter purchased lot 27 from Mr. Walls, and then a couple of years later, lot 18 from Olaf Gustafson.  Descendants of Peter Hunter continue to live on the northern coast of the island.

Services
Among the homes and seasonal cabins of Thetis Island are three Christian organizations: Capernwray Harbour Bible School, Pioneer Pacific Camp and formerly run Camp Columbia. There are also two marinas, Telegraph Harbour with a bistro and Thetis Island marina with a restaurant/pub, a small convenience store with post office, and several bed and breakfast on the island. Thetis Island also operates one of the few one-room schoolhouses left in Canada.

Climate

Thetis Island has a mild climate experiencing less rainfall than the western coast of Vancouver Island as it lies in the rain shadow of Vancouver Island. Vegetation on the island includes many arbutus, Douglas fir and western red cedar. Pilkey Point offers islanders and visitors a great view of the ocean and is a popular attraction.

See also
List of islands of British Columbia
List of communities in British Columbia
Thetis (disambiguation)

References

External links
Map of Thetis Island

Islands of the Gulf Islands
Unincorporated settlements in British Columbia